José López Sallaberry  (16 December 1858, Madrid - 22 June 1927, Madrid) was a Spanish architect and urbanist who worked in the Neoplateresca style.

Life and work 
He began his studies in 1875 at the Higher Technical School of Architecture of Madrid and obtained the title of Architect in 1881. In 1888, he was put in charge of site preparation for what is now known as the Cementerio de la Almudena.

The Casino de Madrid and the Banco Hispano America have both been designated a Spanish Property of Cultural Interest. After 1904, he was an Academician at the Real Academia de Bellas Artes de San Fernando.

This project kept him occupied from 1905 until his death.

He was married to María Monasterio and they had three daughters. He died at his home on the Calle de la Montera and was interred at the Saint Isidore Cemetery.

Selected projects

References

Further reading
Manuel Gómez García, Diccionario Akal de Teatro, Ediciones Akal, 1998  
Manuel Zabala y Gallardo, Necrología del Ilmo. Sr. D. José López Sallaberry, Arquitectura: órgano de la Sociedad Central de Arquitectos, 1927

External links

1858 births
1927 deaths
Spanish architects
Spanish urban planners
Architects from Madrid